Josiah Akanbi "Josy" Ajiboye (born 1948) is a Nigerian painter, illustrator, graphic designer and sociopolitical cartoonist who worked at the Daily Times. He was a cartoonist at the Daily Times newspaper from 1971 to 2000, and his favourite artistic medium was using realism to comment on cultural, political and social issues in Nigeria. His weekly cartoon column "Josy Ajiboye on Sunday" was a popular visual form of entertainment during the military era in the country.  Ajiboye is regarded among cartoon scholars as the longest serving Nigerian cartoonist and the one who brought the craft to the level of art in the country. 

Ajiboye hails from Erinmope Ekiti Ekiti State, Nigeria. He was educated at Yaba College of Technology and was taught by some prominent artists such as Yusuf Grillo and Solomon Wangboje. After his secondary education, he worked as a trainee for African Challenge Magazine, a division of the Sudan Interior Mission. He started work as a cartoonist with the Morning Post. In 1971, he joined Daily Times' Art Department. Ajiboye is also a painter and had his first exhibition in 1977 at the Gong Gallery, Lagos Island. He had a solo exhibition at Terra Kulture in 2011.  All members of Ajiboye's family ( his wife and four children) are all professional artists.

References

Sources

Jimoh, Ganiyu (2018). "Josy Ajiboye: The Reluctant Cartoonist and Social Commentaries in Postcolonial Nigeria". International Journal of Comic Art. 20 (1): 242 -254.
Medubi, Oyin. (2009). Lent, John A. (ed.). Cartooning in Nigeria: Large Canvas, Little Movement. In Cartooning in Africa,. Cresskill: Hampton Press. pp. 197–218.
Francine Kola-Bankole; Josy Ajiboye, the Ultimate Prankster: Political Cartoonist as Egungun. African Arts 2020; 53 (1): 24–37. doi: https://doi.org/10.1162/afar_a_00512

External Links 
Josy Ajiboye: Master cartoonist lives his dream in retirement

Learn More about Josy Ajiboye

Further reading
  Thesis on cartoonist in Nigeria

Living people
Yoruba artists
Yaba College of Technology alumni
20th-century Nigerian artists
People from Ekiti State
Artists from Lagos
21st-century Nigerian artists
Year of birth missing (living people)
Cartoonists
Nigerian cartoonists